Acianthera breviflora is a species of orchid plant native to Mexico.

References 

breviflora
Flora of Mexico